Eden is a 2019 Icelandic drama film directed and written by Snævar Sölvi Sölvason. The film stars Telma Huld Jóhannesdóttir and Hansel Eagle as a drug dealing young couple in Reykjavik who steal narcotics from an infamous drug lord to start a new life. It premiered in Iceland on 10 May 2019.

Cast
Telma Huld Jóhannesdóttir as Lóa
Hansel Eagle as Óliver
Arnar Jónsson as Flugan
Steinunn Ólína Þorsteinsdóttir as Vigga's mother
Tinna Sverrisdóttir as Vigga
Hjalti P. Finnsson as Tumi

References

External links

Eden on Smárabíó

2019 films
Icelandic drama films
2010s Icelandic-language films
2019 drama films